Mongolia competed in the Summer Olympic Games for the first time at the 1964 Summer Olympics in Tokyo, Japan. 21 competitors, 17 men and 4 women, took part in 29 events in 5 sports.

Athletics

Cycling

Four cyclists represented Mongolia in 1964.

 Individual road race
 Yanjingiin Baatar
 Luvsangiin Erkhemjamts
 Luvsangiin Buudai
 Choijiljavyn Samand

 Team time trial
 Yanjingiin Baatar
 Luvsangiin Buudai
 Luvsangiin Erkhemjamts
 Choijiljavyn Samand

Gymnastics

Shooting

Three shooters represented Mongolia in 1964.

50 m pistol
 Tüdeviin Myagmarjav

300 m rifle, three positions
 Lkhamjavyn Dekhlee

50 m rifle, three positions
 Tüvdiin Tserendondov

Wrestling

References

External links
Official Olympic Reports

Nations at the 1964 Summer Olympics
1964
1964 in Mongolian sport